Fulwell 73 is a British television, film and music production company based in London. It was founded in 2005 by brothers Gabe and Ben Turner, Leo Pearlman, and Ben Winston. James Corden became the fifth full time partner in January 2017. Fulwell 73 operates across a wide range of genres and across all media platforms; theatrical, broadcast and digital.

Originally operating within the UK, Fulwell 73 now operates internationally, across a range of television genres, including scripted comedy, factual entertainment, sport and music.

Name 
The name Fulwell 73 is a homage to Sunderland A.F.C. (The "Fulwell End" was the name of a stand at Roker Park and "73" is a reference to the 1973 FA Cup Final, the last time Sunderland won a major trophy). Leo Pearlman, Gabe Turner, and Ben Turner are all Sunderland A.F.C. fans. Ben Winston, however, supported Arsenal FC.

In the summer of 2017, Fulwell 73 announced their plans to buy Sunderland from chairman Ellis Short, but in a statement to fanzine A Love Supreme on 21 June 2017, they withdrew their interest, citing the demands of the business. In 2018, Fulwell 73 produced the Netflix documentary series Sunderland 'Til I Die.

People

Gabe Turner
Gabe Turner has worked as a producer, director and writer across a wide range of Fulwell projects collaborating with Meryl Streep, Arnold Schwarzenegger, David Beckham, James Corden and Billy Crystal among others. His first documentary In the Hands of the Gods was co-directed with his brother Ben, and received widespread critical acclaim. The Class of 92 became the fastest selling sports documentary of all time. In 2014 Gabe directed his first feature The Guvnors (Metrodome), which won two National Film Awards. More recently he completed a documentary about Usain Bolt's journey in his attempt to win a third consecutive gold medal at the Rio Olympics in 2016.

Ben Turner
Ben Turner is a writer director specialising in comedy, sport and music. He started in the industry as an editor at TVC before his first short, Letting Go, played at film festivals around the world and was featured on the South Bank Show. He came to public attention after directing In The Hands of the Gods with his brother Gabe. The film was released nationwide in cinemas by Lionsgate to great critical acclaim. Other sport related films have included Class of ’92 (Universal) and the award-winning First Among Equals (ITV) about Laurie Cunningham, the first black footballer to play for England. Ben has directed music videos for a range of bands including One Direction, Olly Murs, Demi Lovato, Little Mix, 5 Seconds of Summer as well as commercials for brands like Coca-Cola, Sainsbury's, Evans Cycles and Jessops. He has written and directed a range of comedy with David Walliams, Danny DeVito, James Corden, Richard Ayoade and Keith Lemon and worked with stars like Daniel Craig, Gwyneth Paltrow, Hugh Grant, Kate Moss, Andy Murray and Michael Sheen. Ben worked with Gabe Turner on a feature-length documentary on Usain Bolt and in 2019 Hitsville: The Making of Motown.

Leo Pearlman
Following the creation of Fulwell 73 Productions in 2007, Leo has produced multiple hours of television, including James Corden's World Cup Live (ITV), One Direction: A Year in the Making (ITV), Flintoff: From Lords to the Ring (SKY1), The Life of Ryan (ITV), Depression: The Hidden Side of Sport (BBC1). The first feature film Leo produced was In the Hands of the Gods, released by Lionsgate in September 2007, with the widest ever theatrical release for a documentary in the UK. Since then he has produced a number of theatrical features, including; JLS: Eyes Wide Open 3D (Omniverse), Turnout (Revolver), Piggy (Metrodome) and most recently the record-breaking One Direction: This Is Us (Sony/Columbia) and The Class of 92 (Universal). The former took over $70m at the box office, while the latter is the most successful British sports documentary of all time. "Guvnors" (Metrodome), Leo’s most recent scripted feature, enjoyed its world premiere at the Edinburgh International Film Festival, was released theatrically in August 2014 and recently won two National Film Awards for best newcomer and best action. Recent features are Level Up, starring Josh Bowman and Neil Maskell, and  the theatrical doc, I Am Bolt following Usain Bolt through to the Olympics in Rio. As of 2018, Pearlman was producer on Bros: After the Screaming Stops, a fly-on-the-wall documentary about the reunion of English pop band Bros.

Ben Winston
Ben Winston currently serves as Executive Producer of The Late Late Show with James Corden for CBS. He is the youngest show producer of a late-night show in America. Ben started at Fulwell by co-producing In the Hands of the Gods (Lionsgate) in 2007. Since he has produced and directed shows including The Michael McIntyre Chat Show (BBC1), Robbie Williams: One Night at The Palladium (BBC1), This is Justin Bieber (ITV1), One Direction: A Year In The Making, and the record-breaking eight-hour marathon show 1D Day. He also notably produced and directed Gary Barlow: On Her Majesty's Service, which film was the most watched single documentary of that year, while the song that came from it, "Sing" by Gary Barlow & The Commonwealth Band featuring Military Wives, charted at number 1 for three weeks.  In 2014 he was Exec Producer of The X Factor in the UK, the most successful entertainment show on British TV winning best programme at the National Television Awards. His work with James Corden has been extensive: James Corden’s World Cup Live (ITV1), When Corden Met Barlow (BBC1), When Robbie Met James (Sky One). Ben has also produced James as the host of the BRIT Awards for the last four years. For Red Nose Day on BBC1, he directed and co-wrote many memorable Smithy sketches. Ben co-directed the 3D documentary movie JLS: Eyes Wide Open, which opened on more than 400 screens across the UK. At the time it was the biggest grossing music cinema release of all time in the UK, but was beaten by the next film he produced, the One Direction hit movie This Is Us for Columbia Pictures, which broke records around the globe.  As a commercial director, his advert for "A League Of  Own" won the gold award at Berlin Pro Max Awards in 2011. He also directed the 2011 Christmas Campaign for BBC One, Consider Yourself One of Us, and the award-winning campaign for the Sport Relief mile. He has directed many music videos that led to him winning an MTV VMA for his One Direction video Best Song Ever. He is the first ever director to win two Brit Awards in consecutive years for Best Video of the Year, which he won in 2014 and 2015.

Production credits

Film 
Turnout (2011)
Piggy (2012)
The Class Of '92 (2013)
One Direction: This is Us (2013)
The Guvnors (2014)
I Am Bolt (2016)
White Island (2016)
Bros: After the Screaming Stops (2018)
Hitsville: The Making of Motown (2019)
Cinderella (2021)

Television 
One Direction: TV Special
The Late Late Show (2015–present)
Carpool Karaoke: The Series (2017–present)
Drop the Mic (2017–2019)
Seatbelt Psychic (2018–present)
Sunderland 'Til I Die (2018–2020)
Happy Together (2018–2019)
The World's Best (2019)
Ben Platt Live from Radio City Music Hall (2020)
Grammy Awards (2021–present)
The Republic of Sarah (2021)
The Kardashians (2022)
The Three of Us (TBA)
Crush4U (TBA)

Music videos 
One Direction: Drag Me Down
Only The Young: I Do
Olly Murs & Demi Lovato: Up
Zara Larsson: Weak Heart
One Direction: Steal My Girl
One Direction: Night Changes
Raleigh Ritchie: Stay Inside
Littlemix: Word Up
One Direction: You & I
Gary Barlow & Elton John: Face To Face
One Direction: Best Song Ever
One Direction: Midnight Memories
Gary Barlows World Cup Squad: Greatest Day
Merz: Goodbye My Chimera
One Direction: Story Of My Life
5 Seconds Of Summer – Try Hard
Gary Barlow: Let Me Go
One Direction: One Way Or Another
Harry Styles: Golden
Gary Barlow & The Commonwealth: Sing
5 Seconds Of Summer: Wherever You Are
JLS: Proud

TV ads 
Samsung S6
Rimmel
Cadburys
Jessops
Sport Relief
BBC XMAS Idents
Eram Shoes
Evans Cycle
Sony 4K
Lonsdale
Marks & Spencer
James Corden: The Autobiography

Others 
Adele One Night Only
The Feeling Nuts Comedy Night
When Corden Met 
Sounds Like Friday Night
A Bus Could Run You Over (in-production)
When Corden Met Barlow 
Life of Ryan 
Robbie Williams: One Night At The Palladium
Laurie Cunningham
Gary Barlow & Friends
A Very JLS Christmas
When Robbie Met James
Flintoff: From Lords To The Rings
Gary Barlow: On Her Majesty’s Service
This Is Justin Bieber 
One Direction: A Year In The Making 
Freddie Flintoff: Hidden Side of Sport
This Is JLS
James Corden’s World Cup Live
One Direction: Where We Are
JLS: Eyes Wide Open
In The Hands Of The Gods
Hollywood Secrets
The Red Nose USA Brit Crew
Behind The Bond
Harry & Paul
Andy Murray: The Movie
David Walliams Exes
Smithy Saves Comic Relief 
Jimmy Carr
Smithy Wins Coach Of The Year 
Men Behaving Badly
Smithy Meets The England Team

References

External links
Fulwell 73 at Internet Movie Database

Television production companies of the United Kingdom
Film production companies of the United Kingdom
Mass media companies established in 2005
British companies established in 2005
2005 establishments in England
Mass media companies based in London